Agfa flexilis is a species of parasitic nematodes.

Agfa flexilis is the type species of the genus Agfa.

Hosts 
 Limax cinereoniger
 Limax maximus

References

External links 
 http://www.eol.org/pages/471275

Rhabditida
Nematodes described in 1845